Fosu may refer to:

People
 Akwasi Oppong Fosu (born 1958), Ghanaian politician
 Alfons Fosu-Mensah (born 1994), Dutch football player
 Ebenezer Kobina Fosu (born 1952), Ghanaian politician
 Ignatius Osei-Fosu (born 1986), Ghanaian football manager
 KK Fosu (born 1981), Ghanaian musician 
 Tariqe Fosu, Ghanaian football player
 Timothy Fosu-Mensah (born 1998), Dutch football player
 Yaw Fosu-Amoah (born 1981), South African long jumper

Places
 Assin Fosu, Ghana
 Fosu Lagoon, Ghana